The Yanghwa Bridge (양화대교) is an eight lane bridge spanning the Han River in Seoul. The bridge connects Mapo-gu on the north side of the river to Yeongdeungpo-gu on the south side of the river. The bridge is buttressed by the eastern end of the island of Seonyudo, home to Seonyudo Park (선유도공원).

The bridge is a combination of two bridges: the old bridge, originally called the "Second Han River Bridge" (제2한강교), completed in 1965; and the new bridge, completed in 1982. The old bridge was the first bridge built by Korean technology after independence in 1945 and served as the gateway from Seoul to the west coast. Due to increasing traffic, construction for an expansion started in 1979 and the new eight lane bridge was completed in February 1982.

The old bridge's upper structure has a width of 18.0m, length 1,053m and is composed of steel plate girders and concrete box girders. The new bridge has a width of 16.1m, length 1,053m and is a steel plate girder bridge. The lower structure has an open caisson well foundation.

The bridge went through repairs and renovations in 1996 and reopened in April 2002 with additional ramps. As of February 2010, the bridge is once again going through renovations by widening the space between bridge posts to allow 5000t ships to pass. 
Yanghwa Bridge also has a song named after it called "양화대교 Yanghwa Bridge" by R&B/soul singer Zion.T in 2014.

See also
List of Han River bridges

References

 Yanghwa Bridge at Doosan Encyclopedia
 Yanghwa Bridge at Nate Encyclopedia
 Yanghwa Bridge at Britannica Korea

Bridges in Seoul
Bridges completed in 1965
Bridges completed in 1982
1982 establishments in South Korea
20th-century architecture in South Korea